Zofreen T. Ebrahim is an independent freelance journalist based in Karachi, Pakistan. She was an editor of the magazine, Women's own and is the current  editor for The Third Pole; a platform dedicated to promoting information about the Himalayan watershed and the rivers that originate there.

She has contributed to many national and international newspapers. She has also been recognized for her contributions in  the areas of environment and social issues.

Education 
Ebrahim went to Kinnaird College in 1982, where she completed her B.A (Bachelor of Arts) degree in English Literature and Geography. Following her passion for writing, she completed her master's degree in journalism from University of Punjab, Lahore in 1985.

Career 

Ebrahim started her career when she joined the Women's English Language monthly magazine, Women’s Own as an assistant editor and then later becoming its Editor. She is an expert in environment, gender, health, and development.

In 2001, she started working as a freelance journalist. In her career, she has worked with a variety of English dailies like Dawn, The News, Tribune, First Post, News Line and Current Affairs monthly magazine.

She also contributes to various international media services including the Inter Press Service, The Guardian, The Wire, Thomson Reuters and currently The Third Pole. She also consults for various NGO’s and INGO's.

Awards and honours 

Ebrahim has received multiple national and international awards for her work. In 2004, the Ministry of Environment awarded her Green Press Award. She also received second prize in the Developing Asia Journalism Awards. Asian Development Bank Institute awarded her with Inclusive Social Development award.

She was awarded the Global Media Award for Excellence in Population Reporting in the category of Best Individual Reporting Effort by Washington-based Population Institute in 2005.

She was awarded the Green media Award by Tetra Pak in 2007 for her story on how leak of a radioactive waste dump was affecting the health of the nearby villagers and indifference of the government to the issue.

She was the receiver of Women Achiever's Award by Indus Television Network for her writings on women's issues in 2008.

In February 2020, the All Pakistani Newspapers Society (APNS) announced the names of recipients for its annual awards. Ebrahim  was awarded for Best Business / Economics Report in the 24th award distribution ceremony.

References 

Living people
Pakistani women
Pakistani women journalists
Kinnaird College for Women University alumni
Year of birth missing (living people)